Jeon Ji-hee (born 28 October 1992), born Tian Minwei, is a Chinese-born South Korean table tennis player.

Career 
She competed at the 2016 Summer Olympics in the women's singles event, in which she was eliminated in the fourth round by Yu Mengyu, and as part of the South Korean team in the women's team event.

2021 
In March, Jeon played in WTT Doha. In the WTT Contender event, she reached the quarter-finals, where she was upset by Miyuu Kihara. In the WTT Star Contender event, she reached the semi-finals where she lost to Mima Ito. It marked her fourth straight loss to Ito, a likely rival in the upcoming Tokyo Olympics.

Jeon represented South Korea in the women's singles event at the 2020 Tokyo Olympics. Jeon reached the quarter-finals, where she lost 4–0 to Mima Ito.

Singles titles

References

External links
 
 
 

1992 births
Living people
South Korean female table tennis players
Olympic table tennis players of South Korea
Table tennis players at the 2016 Summer Olympics
Universiade medalists in table tennis
People from Langfang
Table tennis players from Hebei
Naturalized citizens of South Korea
Chinese emigrants to South Korea
Naturalised table tennis players
Asian Games medalists in table tennis
Table tennis players at the 2014 Asian Games
Table tennis players at the 2018 Asian Games
Asian Games bronze medalists for South Korea
Medalists at the 2014 Asian Games
Medalists at the 2018 Asian Games
Universiade gold medalists for South Korea
Universiade bronze medalists for South Korea
Expatriate table tennis people in Japan
Medalists at the 2015 Summer Universiade
Medalists at the 2017 Summer Universiade
Table tennis players at the 2020 Summer Olympics